Band of Sisters is a 2017 South Korean television series starring Jang Seo-hee, Kim Ju-hyeon, Kim Da-som and Oh Yoon-ah. It aired on SBS TV every Saturday at 20:45 and 21:55 KST (two episodes per day), taking the slot previously occupied by Our Gap-soon.

Plot
Kang Ha-ri (Kim Ju-hyeon), with her bright personality, works part-time at a stationery store and a nail shop. Min Deul-rae (Jang Seo-hee) was a popular actress, but she isn't so popular these days. Kim Eun-hyang (Oh Yoon-ah) worked as a secretary prior to the birth of her daughter, but she now focuses on raising her. These three women lost their most beloved (Ha-ri's fiancé, Dal-rae's mother and Eun-hyang's daughter) during a singular accident cause by Yang Dal-hee (who murdered and impersonated a rich heiress from the States, Sera Park). Even though they are not related, they rely on each other to get through the tough time and reveal the truth. As the truth unravels, this web of lies draw in many other seemingly innocent by-standers. This new sisterhood must now decide whether revenge is worth the collateral damage.

Cast

Main
 Jang Seo-hee as Min Deul-rae
A famous actress whose popularity is on the decline. Immature and spoiled by her mother, who does everything for her. She seeks revenge for her mother, who died while trying to protect her daughter from a stalker's assault. The police vehicle that would've saved her mother was involved in a multi-vehicle crash.
 Oh Yoon-ah as Kim Eun-hyang
Former corporate secretary and loving, yet overbearing, mother to her seven-year-old daughter Ah-reum. She seeks revenge for her daughter, who died in a house fire. Choo Tae-soo, her husband, had left their daughter sleeping with a lit candle. The fire truck that would've saved Ah-reum was involved in a multi-vehicle crash.
 Kim Ju-hyeon as Kang Ha-ri
An orphan who inherited her parents' stationery shop, and is raising her teenage sister. Now a widow, her husband died in a car accident on her wedding day. The ambulance carrying her husband to the hospital was overturned in a multi-vehicle crash.
 Kim Da-som as Yang Dal-hee / Sera Park
An ambitious antagonist. After being mistreated under Sera Park's employ, and an altercation which leaves Sera Park in a coma, Yang Dal-hee moves back to South Korea and assumes the identity of Sera Park. She is the ex-girlfriend of Seol Gi-Chan, and she stole his chamomile and sold it to Goo Se-kyung of Ruby Cosmetics. She is the one responsible for the multi-vehicle crash. She disowns her younger stepsister, Jin Hong-shi. She is intent on marrying Goo Se-joon, as he is the heir to Ruby Cosmetics.
 Lee Ji-hoon as Seol Gi-chan
A bright entrepreneur, he is the son of Ruby Cosmetics' Goo Pil-mo and his late wife, but was raised in an orphanage. His beauty serum derived from chamomile was stolen by his ex-girlfriend, Yang Dal-hee.  
 Cho Yoon-woo as Goo Se-joon
The illegitimate son of Ruby Cosmetics chairman Goo Pil-mo and the maid, Ms. Lee. He leans heavily on his grandmother, Sa Goon-ja, for support. He later develops a crush on Kang Ha-Ri.
 Son Yeo-eun as Goo Se-kyung
The daughter of Goo Pil-mo, she is deputy director and heiress of Ruby Cosmetics. She has had an affair with Choo Tae-soo for three years, and is the mother of Jo Yong-ha, but largely neglects him. She targeted Seol Gi-chan by cutting the brakes on his car. Kim Eun-hyang holds her responsible for the death of Ah-reum, but later they become friends.

Supporting

Gongryung Group
 Kim Soo-mi as Sa Goon-ja
The mother of Goo Pil-mo and Goo Pil-soon. She suspects Seol Gi-chan of being her long-lost grandson Se Ho.
 Son Chang-min as Goo Pil-mo
The chairman of Ruby Cosmetics. He mourns his late wife, who died not long after his legitimate son, Se Ho, went missing. He falls in love with actress Min Deul-Re, who is a dead ringer for his late wife.
 Byun Jung-soo as Goo Pil-soon
The fun-loving unmarried sister of Goo Pil-mo. She dotes on her pug, Jewels. 
 Song Jong-ho as Jo Han-sung
The husband of Goo Se-kyung, he was formerly a country boy, and also works at Ruby Cosmetics. 
 Kim Sung-han as Jo Yong-ha
The son of Goo Se-kyung and Jo Han-sung, he has a reactive autistic disorder that doctors believe stems from a lack of affection. He is largely ignored by his mother, yet close to his father and to his tutor, Kim Eun-hyung. 
 Yang Jung-a as Lee Gye-hwa
The scheming maid and mother of Goo Se-joon. She is responsible for kicking Goo Se-ho out of the home when he was a child, and for the death of Sa Goon-ja.

People related to Ha-ri

 Ahn Nae-sang as Na Dae-in (father-in-law)
 Hwang Young-hee as Go Sang-mi (mother-in-law)
 Sung Hyuk as Na Jae-il (deceased husband)
 Lee Jae-jin as Na Jae-dong (brother-in-law)
 Jin Ji-hee as Kang Ha-sae (sister)
 Oh Ah-rin as Jin Hong-si

People related to Deul-rae
 Sung Byung-suk as Deul-rae's mother

People related to Eun-hyang
 Park Gwang-hyun as Joo Tae-soo
Eun-hyang's husband, who is having a secret affair with Go Se-kyung.

Extended
 Kim Nam-hee as Choi Young-hoon
 Lee Ga-ryeong as Chae-rin
 Kim Jae-hyun as Jae-hyun
 Song Ha-yoon as Sera Park
A New Jersey-born chaebol daughter and Dal-hee's spoiled client, she was heavily injured in an altercation with the latter at her own house. Sera Park is later revealed to have regained consciousness, despite losing her sight.
 Jeon Soo-kyeong as Vicky Jung
The mother of the real Sera Park, she discovers Yang Dal-hee has assumed the identity of her daughter.
 Lee Yu-ri as Yeon Min Jeong
The assistant of Vicky Jung and a friend of Chairman Geum. She knew all about Yang Dal Hee's crimes. And she came to the ambulance to pick up Sa Goon Ja in order not to be caught by Yang Dal Hee.

Production 
 The first script reading took place March 8, 2017 at SBS Ilsan Production Studios in Goyang, South Korea.
 Jo Bo-ah was offered to portray Kang Ha-ri, but declined.
 Band of Sisters is written by Kim Soon-ok and directed by Choi Young-hoon. This is their second collaboration since Five Fingers in 2012.
 It is also the second time that Kim and Jang Seo-hee have worked together after Temptation of Wife.

Major photography locations
 SBS Broadcasting Center 
 SBS Ilsan Production Center B Studio 
 Baxter Studio 
 Sangam-dong SBS Prism Tower

Ratings
In the table below,  represent the lowest ratings and  represent the highest ratings.

Original soundtrack

Part 1

Part 2

Part 3

Part 4

Awards and nominations

International broadcast
In Singapore, Malaysia, Indonesia (until September 30, 2017), Cambodia, Australia and Brunei, was airing on Sony One for original language on May 13, 2017, re-air and dubbed with Mandarin and Malay on April 4, 2018, but Indonesia was aired on SBS-in at these time. Was also airing on Mediacorp Channel U on weekdays at 7 pm, beginning March 18, 2019.
In Hong Kong, was airing on Cable Drama Channel (Channel 13/213) on January 1, 2018, for every day, re-air on Fantastic TV 77 on May 17, 2018, at midnight. 
In Taiwan, was airing on Star Chinese Channel during The Chinese New Year on February 21, 2018, Re-air on Star Entertainment Channel and FOX Taiwan Channel on March 19 and May 16.
 In Myanmar, was airing on MNTV channel under Skynet International Dramas as "ခိုနားရာရင်ခွင်" and new episodes aired every Monday and Tuesday at 7 pm, beginning May 1, 2019. The episodes were replayed the next days at 11:30 pm and 3:30 pm, and on the weekends at 9:00 am.
In India, Will Planning Join Venture On Viacom 18 For Dubbed Hindi, Bengali and Marathi and Star India For Dubbed Tamil, Malayalam and Telugu.
उनी जीवित है (Unee Jeevie Hai) On Colors TV.
ইউনিনি আলি (I'unini ali) On Colors Bangla.
Unni जिवंत आहे (Unni jivanta ahe) On Colors Marathi.
சகோதரிகளின் இசைக்குழு (Cakotarikalin icaikkulu Sisters) On Star Vijay
സഹോദരിമാരുടെ സഹോദരി (Saheadarimarute Saheadari) on Asianet
సోదరీమణుల బ్యాండ్ (Sodarimanula byand) On Star Maa.

Notes

References

External links
  
 
 
 
 Production Website

Seoul Broadcasting System television dramas
Korean-language television shows
2017 South Korean television series debuts
2017 South Korean television series endings
South Korean melodrama television series
Television series by SM Life Design Group
Television shows written by Kim Soon-ok